K'Zell Ray Wesson (born June 24, 1977, pronounced Kay-Zell) is an American former professional basketball player. He is 6' 7.5" (2.02 m) in height and he weighs 242 lbs. (110 kg). He plays the position of power forward-center.

College career
Wesson played college basketball at South Carolina State University (1995–96), the College of Eastern Utah (1996–97) and at La Salle University with the La Salle men's basketball team, the La Salle Explorers (1997–1999).

Notes

External links
Player Profile - Euroleague.net
Player Profile - TBLStat.net
Basketpedya.com Profile
Player Profile - Kingstonebasketball.com
Eurobasket.com Interview after signing with AEK
Player Profile - Turkish Beko Basketball League

1977 births
Living people
AEK B.C. players
African-American basketball players
Afyonkarahisar Belediyespor players
American expatriate basketball people in France
American expatriate basketball people in Germany
American expatriate basketball people in Greece
American expatriate basketball people in Italy
American expatriate basketball people in Kosovo
American expatriate basketball people in Turkey
American expatriate basketball people in Venezuela
American men's basketball players
Basketball players from Portland, Oregon
BCM Gravelines players
Beşiktaş men's basketball players
Brose Bamberg players
Cholet Basket players
Cocodrilos de Caracas players
Erdemirspor players
Greek Basket League players
Jefferson High School (Portland, Oregon) alumni
Karşıyaka basketball players
KB Prishtina players
La Salle Explorers men's basketball players
Lega Basket Serie A players
P.A.O.K. BC players
Pertevniyal S.K. players
Power forwards (basketball)
Roseto Sharks players
South Carolina State Bulldogs basketball players
SIG Basket players
Trenton Shooting Stars players
Türk Telekom B.K. players
Utah State Eastern Golden Eagles men's basketball players
21st-century African-American sportspeople
20th-century African-American sportspeople